Kristina Katarina "Stina Kajsa" Larsdotter (19 January 1819, Brännäs in Malå - 27 May 1854), known as Långa lappflickan (The Tall Laponia Girl), The Lapland Giantess, and Stor-Stina (Big Stina), was a Swedish Sami, who aroused great attention among her contemporaries because of her height. She was 210 cm (6 feet 10.7 inches) tall. From 1837 onward, she toured Sweden, Great Britain, Denmark, France and Russia exhibiting herself for money under the stage name "The Lapland Giantess - Tallest Woman in the World".

Stor-Stina eventually returned to her family in Brännäs in Malå. She died of gangrene.

She is portrayed in the 1981 novel Långa lappflickan by Åke Lundgren, and in the 2012 novel Rekviem för en vanskapt by Mattias Hagberg.

References
 Stina Kajsa i Wilhelmina Stålberg, Anteckningar om svenska qvinnor (1864)
Åke Lundgren om bakgrunden till Långa lappflickan
Mattias Olofssons performance om Stor-Stina

Further reading

Swedish Sámi people
1819 births
1854 deaths
People in Sámi history
Sideshow performers
People with gigantism
Deaths from gangrene